Jack A. Cooper was a male athlete who competed for England.

Athletics career
He competed for England in the 880 yards at the 1934 British Empire Games in London.

References

English male middle-distance runners
Athletes (track and field) at the 1934 British Empire Games
Commonwealth Games competitors for England